Pandit Mangat Ram Sharma (died 3 November 2016) was an Indian politician and Deputy Chief Minister of Jammu and Kashmir as well as speaker of Jammu and Kashmir Legislative Assembly. He was a leader of the Indian National Congress.

He also won Jammu-Poonch Lok Sabha seat in 1996.

He was Deputy Chief Minister of Jammu and Kashmir from November 2002 to November 2005 under Mufti Muhammad Sayeed which was PDP-Congress coalition government. He was also Health Minister of Jammu and Kashmir under Ghulam Nabi Azad.
Pandit Mangat Ram had created history by becoming the first Deputy Chief Minister from the Congress. He was the second Deputy Chief Minister from the Jammu region.

In 1984, Devi Das Thakur, a Supreme Court lawyer, became the first Deputy Chief Minister from the Jammu region in the government headed by GM Shah. He was not a Congress leader.

It was only with the appointment of Mangat Ram as the Deputy Chief Minister that a precedent had been set to appoint the Deputy Chief Minister from the Jammu region if the Chief Minister was from the Kashmir valley to ease acrimonious tension between the two regions.

In his six-decade-long political career, Mangat Ram had served the state in different capacities. He was the only leader in the state to earn respect in all three regions of J&K.

He was known for his accessibility and unlike other politicians, was easily available to the common man during his days in power. He remained as troubleshooter for the Congress for years together.

Mangat Ram had effectively handled the controversial Jammu and Kashmir Permanent Residents Women (Disqualification) Bill in 2004 and saved the then coalition regime.

He had started his career as a social activist in the early 1950s. He resigned from government service as Block Development Officer and joined active politics in the 1960s.

He was made a Member of the Legislative Council in 1961 and 1968. 

In 1972, he entered the Assembly from the Basohli segment of Kathua district in the Jammu region on Congress ticket. He was re-elected from the same constituency in 1977 and 1983.

He was elected as MLA from the Jammu West Assembly constituencies in 1987 and 2002. In the 1996 General Election, he won from the Jammu-Poonch segment.

He was described in political circles as one of the most astute politicians and was close to the Gandhi family. As Speaker of the Assembly, he earned respect among the legislators for his unassuming and impartial nature.

Born on November 17, 1926, in Jammu, Mangat Ram was a prominent politician of the Congress. He graduated from the GGM Science College J&K University, in 1952.

He is survived by six sons, daughters-in-law and grandchildren.

References

Deputy chief ministers of Jammu and Kashmir
2016 deaths
Indian National Congress politicians from Jammu and Kashmir
Year of birth missing
Lok Sabha members from Jammu and Kashmir
India MPs 1996–1997
Politicians from Jammu
Jammu and Kashmir Peoples Democratic Party politicians

http://loksabhaph.nic.in/writereaddata/biodata_1_12/3789.htm

https://www.tribuneindia.com/news/archive/features/man-who-set-deputy-cm-precedent-in-state-318431